Patric Hemgesberg (born November 3, 1973, in Brühl) is a German poet.

Life and career 
Patric Hemgesberg was born in 1973 in Brühl. After a brief study of social education he has worked since 2001 as a home educator in a home for disabled people in Bonn. In addition to the normal jobs, he also developed a talent in the writing guild. Since early 2000 he is represented as a lyricist with various publications in numerous poetry anthologies, including the Heyne Verlag in the anthology Weißt Du noch das Zauberwort, published by Kristiane Allert-Wybranietz, 2002 in the Young Poetry series Junge Lyrik in the Martin Werhand Verlag or edited by Axel Kutsch in the Poetry anthology Zeit. Wort: Deutschsprachige Lyrik der Gegenwart.

More publications can be found in particular in poetry magazines like Die Brücke - Forum für antirassistische Politik und Kultur, or Federwelt. Furthermore, he is represented with his poems in various poetry anthologies of the Cologne Ferber publisher.

In 2003, the poetry book Tor zur Hölle: bitte leise schließen; Gedichte um einen verrückten Planeten was published.

Patric Hemgesberg has numerous readings in North Rhine-Westphalia, organized with his poems in the Bonn-Cologne area. In 2003, the Thalia bookstore organized via its parent company Poertgen Herder in Münster on World Book Day on April 23 a reading with the anthology series Junge Lyrik.

Patric Hemgesberg is father of two sons and lives with his family in Bornheim near Bonn.

Publications (selection)

Books 
 Tor zur Hölle: bitte leise schließen; Gedichte um einen verrückten Planeten. Lyrik, Ferber Verlag, Cologne 2003, .

Anthologies (selection) 
 Weißt Du noch das Zauberwort. Anthology, Heyne Verlag, Munich 2000, . 
 Junge Lyrik III - 50 Dichterinnen und Dichter. Anthology, Martin Werhand Verlag, Melsbach 2002, . Also second, revised edition. (edited by Martin Werhand)
 Rot trifft Blau. Anthologie, Ferber-Verlag, Cologne, 2002, .
 Ein leises Du. Anthology, Geest-Verlag, Vechta, 2003, . 
 Schreiben. Ich schreibe, weil... Anthology, Ferber-Verlag, Cologne, 2003, .
 Zeit. Wort: Deutschsprachige Lyrik der Gegenwart. Anthology, Landpresse, Weilerswist, 2003, .
 11. September 2001 - eine literarische Retrospektive. Anthology, Verlagshaus Monsenstein und Vannerdat, 2003, .
 Einmal ist keinmal - CalVino Rosso. Anthology, Ferber-Verlag, Cologne, 2004, .

Literature 
 Patric Hemgesberg in: Deutsches Literatur-Lexikon. Das 20. Jahrhundert Band 16: Heinemann - Herrmann, Walter de Gruyter, 2011, Seite 396

External links 
 Official website of Patric Hemgesberg 
 
 Patric Hemgesberg in: Lyrikwelt 
 Patric Hemgesberg in: WorldCat

References 

1973 births
Living people
People from Brühl (Rhineland)
20th-century German poets
German male poets
21st-century German poets
21st-century German male writers
20th-century German male writers